Thiruvasagam is a volume of Tamil hymns composed by the ninth century Shaivite bhakti poet Manikkavasagar. It contains 51 compositions and constitutes the eighth volume of the Tirumurai, the sacred anthology of the Tamil Shaiva Siddhanta.

Legend has it that Manikkavasakar was appointed as minister by king Arimarttanar and sent to purchase 10,000 horses from Arab traders but spent the money building a temple in Tirupperunturai.

As the legend goes, Thiruvasagam is the only work which is signed as well as written  by Lord Shiva in guise of a Tamil man when narrated by Manikkavasagar. The poet chased the writer but without success but the palm leaf manuscript had been seen inside the locked sanctum sanctorum of Thillai Nataraja with the Lord's signature.

Poet
Manikkavasagar's Thiruvasagam and Thirukovayar are compiled as the eighth Thirumurai and is full of visionary experience, divine love and urgent striving for truth.  Though he is not counted as one of the 63 Saiva nayanars, he is counted as one of the Nalvars ("The Four") consisting of himself and the first three nayanars namely Appar, Sambandhar and Sundarar. He was born in an  Pandithar saivite temple priest guild in Tiruvatavur near Madurai.  His father was an adivsor to the Pandya king and he followed his father's footsteps in becoming the king's minister. He is believed to be in the 10th or 11th century, but G. U. Pope places him in 7th or 8th century.  Manickavasgar was the king's prime minister and renounced his post in search of divinity.  The king bestowed his minister to buy horses, but he was taken to divinity by the vision of Siva with his saints.  The minister spent his entire sum of money in building the temple at Thiruperunturai, considered an architectural marvel among Hindu temples.  From the time, the saint poet wandered to various temples and devoted hymns on Siva.  His conversion is attributed to Sivagnana bodham, an saivite work by Meykandar.  He was an orthodox saivite and represents bhakti at its highest form in his age.

Tirupperunturai, also known as Avudayar Koil, is a Shiva temple where Thiruvasagam is believed to have been originated. Manikkavasagar is said to have converted the king to Shaivism and built the temple with money that had been intended for war-horses.

Work

Most of the portions in Thiruvasagam is first sung in Thillai Nataraja Temple at Chidambaram. It is considered one of the profound works of Tamil literature and it discusses every phase of spiritual path from doubt and anguish to perfect understanding in Shiva, from earthly experience to teacher-disciple relationship and ultimately freedom from rebirth.  There are 658 poems in the work and along with 400 poems in Tirukovayar by the same author make it the 8th volume of Tirumarai - the 12 volume Saiva canon.  The author finds both theistic and pantheistic ideas corresponding to medieval India, but identifies God with the universe. Manickavasagar often finds himself unworthy of lord Shiva being his saviour. "கடையவனேனைக் கருணையினால் கலந்து, ஆண்டுகொண்ட விடையவனே ". It is said that this made lord Shiva feel sorry for Vasagar and bless him.  As a devotional literature, it finds alternatives between joy and sorrow.

Thiruvempavai

"Tiruvempavai" - the early morning wake up songs sung for Lord Shiva on Tamil month Margazhi are part of Tiruvasakam.Tiruvempavai songs were composed in Annamalaiyar Temple.

In Thailand, an annual Giant Swing ceremony known as Triyampavai-Tripavai was held in major cities until 1935, when it was abolished for safety reasons. The name of the ceremony was derived from the names of Thiruvempavai and Thiruppavai (a Vaishnavite hymn by Andal). It is known that Thiruvempavai verses — poet pratu sivalai ("opening the portals of Shiva's home") — were recited at this ceremony, as well as the coronation ceremony of the Thai king. According to T.P. Meenakshisundaram, the name of the festival indicates that Thiruppavai might have been recited as well.

Compilation
Raja Raja Chola I (985-1013 CE) embarked on a mission to recover the hymns after hearing short excerpts of Tevaram in his court.  He sought the help of Nambi Andar Nambi, who was a priest in a temple.  It is believed that by divine intervention Nambi found the presence of scripts, in the form of cadijam leaves half eaten by white ants in a chamber inside the second precinct in Thillai Nataraja Temple, Chidambaram.  The brahmanas (Dikshitars) in the temple opposed the mission, but Rajaraja intervened by consecrating the images of the saint-poets through the streets of Chidambaram.  Rajaraja thus became known as Tirumurai Kanda Cholan meaning one who saved the Tirumurai.  Thus far Shiva temples only had images of god forms, but after the advent of Rajaraja, the images of the Nayanar saints were also placed inside the temple.  Nambi arranged the hymns of three saint poets Sambandar, Appar and Sundarar as the first seven books, Manickavasagar's Tirukovayar Thiruvasagam as the 8th book,  the 28 hymns of nine other saints as the 9th book, the Tirumandiram of Tirumular as the 10th book, 40 hymns by 12 other poets as the 10th book, Tirutotanar Tiruvanthathi - the sacred anthathi of the labours of the 63 nayanar saints and added his own hymns as the 11th book.  The first seven books were later called as Tevaram, and the whole Saiva canon, to which was added, as the 12th book, Sekkizhar's Periya Puranam (1135 CE) is wholly known as Tirumurai, the holy book.

Translation works on Thiruvasagam

There is a famous saying  
translating to "One who is not melted by Thiruvasagam cannot be melted by any vasagam (saying)". George Uglow Pope was born on 24 April 1820 on Prince Edward Island in Canada. He became interested in Tamil and learned the language during a six-month ship voyage to India. His magnum opus, an English translation of Thiruvasagam, appeared in 1900.  Pope found a close affinity to the utterances of sincere devotion in such verses as 'Longing for devotion alone', 'Without thy presence I pine', 'Deadness of soul', 'God all in all', 'I am thine, save me', 'His love demands my all'.  He also compared Manickavasgar to the likes of St. Paul and St. Francis of Assisi.

G.U.Pope Translation
G.U.Pope translated Thiruvasagam. 
Victory to the foot of the King, who soothed my soul's unrest and made me His !
Victory to the jewelled foot of Pinnagan, who severs continuity of birth !
Victory to the flower-foot of Him Who is far from those without !
Victory to the anklets of the King, rejoicing 'mid those that fold adoring hands !
Victory to the anklets of the glorious One, who uplifts those that bow the head ! (10)

And in places G.U.Pope mentions the difficulty about translating these Tamil poems to the proper meaning in English.He states,
"Lines 66-95 are well nigh untranslateable, for they contain a subtle and intricate allegory, by means of which the grace of the manifested Shivan, who is praised under the title of the 'Cloud' is set forth. The idea is that the Infinite sea of rapturous supreme felicity is Civan, but - as the Cloud in the monsoon season sucks up water from the sea, and rises in black masses that cover the sky, while all the phenomena of the wonderful outburst of the beneficient, but also fearful, monsoon are exhibited - so does the Supreme manifest Himself as the Guru, the Object of Love, and Give of grace to His worshippers..."

Other works
In 1921, an English translation of the hymns by Sambandhar, Apparswami, Sundaramurthi was done by Francis Kingsbury and GE Phillips, both of United Theological College, Bangalore (Edited by Fred Goodwill) and published in a book as Hymns of the Tamil Śaivite Saints, by the Oxford University Press.

Noted Tamil film music composer Ilayaraja had composed Thiruvasagam in Symphony from the verses of Manikkavasagar's Thiruvasakam as a tribute to the saint and the Tamil itself. All songs are orchestral renditions of the verses of Thiruvasagam.

In culture
Ramalinga Swamigal (1823-1874 CE) is believed to have taken inspiration from Thiruvasagam for his devotional work.

Portions of Thiruvasagam are also read out by the Chief Brahmin Priest of Thailand during the coronation ceremony of a new Thai King. The ancestors of the Brahmins of the Thai Royal Household are thought to have emigrated from Rameswaram to Thailand centuries back.

List of temple revered in Thiruvasagam

Notes

References

 
 
 
 
.
 .
 .
 .

External links
 Transliteration & G. U. Pope's translation of Thiruvasagam
 Shaivam.org
 Composer Ilaiyaraaja's rendering
 A detailed review of the oratorio of Thiruvasagam by Ilaiyaraja
 Ecstasy of Spirit: Recital by Siddhar Maha Siva Swamy & benediction
 Thiruvempavai explanation meaning

Hymns
Shaiva texts
Shaivism
Tamil-language literature
Bhakti movement